The Old Gray County Courthouse is a brick building at 117 South Main Street, Cimarron, Kansas. It was built as a  department store in 1880 and leased to Gray County for use as a courthouse in January 1888.

It was a location of the Battle of Cimarron in 1889.

See also

 National Register of Historic Places listings in Kansas
 Old Logan County Courthouse (Russell Springs, Kansas)

References

County courthouses in Kansas
Courthouses on the National Register of Historic Places in Kansas
1880 establishments in Kansas
1888 establishments in Kansas
Government buildings completed in 1880
Buildings and structures in Gray County, Kansas
National Register of Historic Places in Gray County, Kansas
Italianate architecture in Kansas